Gary Piquer  is a Spanish actor. He appeared in more than forty films since 1979.

Selected filmography

References

External links 

Year of birth missing (living people)
Living people
Spanish male film actors
21st-century Spanish male actors